Gangakhed Assembly constituency is one of 288 assembly constituencies of Maharashtra state of India. It comes under Parbhani (Lok Sabha constituency) for Indian general elections.

Geographical Scope
This constituency includes Gangakhed, Purna and Palam tehsils.

Members of Legislative assembly

Election results

2019 results

References

Assembly constituencies of Maharashtra
Parbhani district